The good old days is a term used when referring to better times in the past.

The Good Old Days or Good Old Days may also refer to:

Film and television
The Good Old Days (film), a 1940 British comedy set in 1840
The Good Old Days (UK TV series), a popular BBC television light entertainment television program which ran from 1953 to 1983 
The Good Old Days (Hong Kong TV series), a 1996 Hong Kong drama series set in the early 20th century

Music
"Good Old Days" (Leroy Shield song), 1930 theme song for the Our Gang comedies, now known as The Little Rascals
"The Good Old Days", by Roger Miller 1965
"Good Old Days", a song on the 1988 album Even Worse by "Weird Al" Yankovic
"The Good Old Days", a song on the 2002 album Up the Bracket by UK band The Libertines
"The Good Old Days", a song from the 2003 album Shootenanny! by Eels
"Good Old Days", a bonus track on the deluxe edition of Pink's 2012 album The Truth About Love
"Good Old Days," one of two song from the 2014 EP of the same name, by American Indie Rock Band, The Features
"Good Old Days" (Macklemore song), 2017
"Good Ol' Days", 2022 studio album by the Reklaws
"Good Ol' Days", song by the Reklaws

Book
The Good Old Days: The Holocaust as Seen by Its Perpetrators and Bystanders, a book by Ernst Klee, Willi Dressen and Volker Reiss

See also
In the Good Old Days (When Times Were Bad), 1969 Dolly Parton album